761 Naval Air Squadron (761 NAS) was a Naval Air Squadron of the Royal Navy's Fleet Air Arm. It was formed at RNAS Yeovilton, as a Fleet Fighter School, in 1941. The squadron moved to RNAS Henstridge, in 1943, as part of the No. 2 Naval Air Fighter School. It remained at Henstridge and in this role, until January 1946, when the squadron disbanded.

History of 761 NAS

Naval Air Fighter School (1941 - 1946) 
761 Naval Air Squadron formed, on the 1 August 1941, at RNAS Yeovilton (HMS Heron) near Yeovil, Somerset, as a Fleet Fighter School. It was initially equipped with Fulmar and Sea Hurricane aircraft. During 1942, Roc and Spitfire aircraft were also used.

On the 10 April 1943, 761 NAS relocated to RNAS Henstridge (HMS Dipper), situated near Henstridge, in Somerset, as part of No.2 Naval Air Fighter School. At this point the squadron was equipped with a mix of eighteen Spitfire and Seafire aircraft, along with six Miles Master aircraft.

761 NAS disbanded at Henstridge on the 16 January 1946.

Aircraft flown 

The squadron has flown a number of different aircraft types, including:
Fairey Fulmar Mk.I (Aug 1941 - Apr 1943)
Fairey Fulmar Mk.II (Aug 1941 - Apr 1943)
Blackburn Roc I (Apr 1942 - Jul 1942)
Supermarine Spitfire Mk I (Sep 1942 - Jul 1944)
Miles M.9B Master I (Apr 1943 - Nov 1943)
Miles M.19 Master II (Apr 1943 - Jan 1946)
Supermarine Seafire Mk Ib (Apr 1943 - Mar 1945)
Supermarine Spitfire Mk Va (Apr 1943 - Jan 1945)
Supermarine Spitfire Mk Vb (Apr 1943 - Jan 1945)
Supermarine Spitfire Mk Vb "hooked" (Nov 1943 - Feb 1945)
Supermarine Seafire Mk III  (Apr 1944 - Jan 1946)
Supermarine Seafire F Mk IIc (Jul 1944 - Aug 1945)
North American Harvard III (Nov 1944 - Jan 1946)
Supermarine Seafire F Mk XV (Jul 1945 - Jan 1946)
Supermarine Seafire Seafire F Mk XVII (Nov 1945 - Jan 1946)

Naval Air Stations  

766 Naval Air Squadron operated from a couple of naval air stations of the Royal Navy, in England:
Royal Naval Air Station YEOVILTON (1 August 1941 - 10 April 1943)
Royal Naval Air Station HENSTRIDGE (10 April 1943 - 16 January 1946)

Commanding Officers 

List of commanding officers of 761 Naval Air Squadron with month and year of appointment and end:

Lt C. P. Campbell-Horsefall, RN (Aug 1941-Jan 1942)
Capt R. C. Hay, DSC, RM (Jan 1942-Jul 1942)
Lt R. B. Pearson, RN (Jul 1942-Sep 1942)
Lt W. C. Simpson, RNVR (Sep 1942-Oct 1942)
Lt A. C. Wallace, RN (Oct 1942-Nov 1942)
not identified (Nov 1942-Apr 1943)
Lt-Cdr R. J. Cork, DSO, DSC, RN (Apr 1943-Nov 1943)
Lt-Cdr R. H. P. Carver, DSC, RN (Nov 1943-Sep 1944)
Lt-Cdr S. G. Orr, DSC, RNVR (Sep 1944-Apr 1946)
Lt-Cdr P. N. Charlton, DSC, RN (Apr 1946-Jan 1946)

Notes

References 

700 series Fleet Air Arm squadrons
Military units and formations established in 1941
Air squadrons of the Royal Navy in World War II